The president of Gabon is the head of state of Gabon. A total of three people have served as president (not counting two acting presidents) since the post was formed in 1960.

Description of the office

Election
The president of the republic is elected for a presidential term of seven (7) years, by universal and direct suffrage. The president is re-electable.

The election is won by the candidate who obtains the largest number of votes.

All Gabonese citizens, male and female, who are at least forty (40) years old, have resided in Gabon for at least twelve (12) months, and who enjoy their full civil and political rights are eligible to run for the seat of the presidency.

The Constitutional Court may extend the provisioned time periods conforming to Article 11 below, but the elections may not take place more than thirty-five (35) days after the date of the decision of the Constitutional Court.

If an application of the policies in the present paragraphs postpones the election to a date beyond the last day in office of the current president, the president will remain in office until the election of the successor.

The ways and means by which the present article may be applied are fixed by organic law.

The presidential term begins on the day he presents himself for the presidential oath and finishes at the end of the seventh year following his election.

The election of the president of the republic takes place at least a month and at most two months before the end of the previous president’s term.

A current president may not shorten his or her term in any manner to run for another term.

If the current president of the republic runs for the next presidential term, the National Assembly may not be dissolved. The president may also not exercise his power to legislate by ordinance from the moment he announces his candidacy up to the election. In cases of necessity, Parliament may convene in an extraordinary session.

Oath of office
The presidential oath marks the beginning of the presidential term. It may not take place before the Constitutional Court’s decision to proclaim the official election results.

At the moment of the president’s entry into office, the president of the republic will solemnly take the oath below, before the Parliament and the Constitutional Court, the left hand on the Constitution, and the other hand raised before the national flag:

Vacancy
In case of a vacancy of the presidential office for whatever reason, or a permanent impairment of the current president, affirmed by the Constitutional Court called upon by the government through an absolute majority of its members, or failing that, by the bureaus of the two chambers of Parliament with a majority of their members, the president of the Senate will temporarily exercise the duties of the president of the republic, or in case of permanent impairment of the president of the Senate, affirmed by the Constitutional Court called upon in the same conditions, the first vice-president of the Senate will temporarily carry out the duties of the presidential office.

The authority that assumes the presidential office in the interim will be temporarily invested with the full duties and powers of the president of the republic, to the exclusion of certain duties and powers provisioned by Articles 18, 19, and the first paragraph of 116. The temporary president may not present him or herself as a candidate of the next presidential election.

Before his or her entry into office, the authority concerned will take the oath of office according to the conditions of Article 12 above.

In the case of a vacancy, or if the president’s impairment is declared permanent by the Constitutional Court, the polls for the election of the new president, excluding cases of emergency announced by the Constitutional Court, will take place at least thirty (30) days or at most sixty (60) days after the beginning of the vacancy or the declaration of a permanent impairment of the president.

List of officeholders
Political parties

Symbols

Timeline

Latest election

Notes

See also
First Lady of Gabon
Vice President of Gabon
Prime Minister of Gabon
List of colonial governors of Gabon
Politics of Gabon

References

External links
 
World Statesmen – Gabon
1991 Constitution of Gabon (as amended in 2011)

Gabon
Presidents
1960 establishments in Gabon
Gabon history-related lists